In laser physics, gain or amplification is a process where the medium transfers part of its energy to the emitted electromagnetic radiation, resulting in an increase in optical power. This is the basic principle of all lasers.
Quantitatively, gain is a measure of the ability of a laser medium to increase optical power.

Definition
The gain can be defined as the derivative of logarithm of power 
as it passes through the medium. The factor by which an input beam is amplified by a medium is called the gain and is represented by G.

where  is the coordinate in the direction of propagation.
This equation neglects the effects of the transversal profile of beam.

In the quasi-monochromatic paraxial approximation, the gain can be taken into account with the following equation
,

where 
 is variation of index of refraction (Which is supposed to be small),

 is complex field, related to the physical electric field
 with relation 
, where
 is vector of polarization,
 is wavenumber,
 is frequency,

is transversal Laplacian;
 means real part.

Gain in quasi two-level system
In the simple quasi two-level system, 
the gain can be expressed in terms of populations
 and 
 of lower and excited states:

where  
 and

are effective emission and absorption cross-sections. In the case of non-pumped medium, the gain is negative.

Round-trip gain means gain multiplied by the length of propagation of the laser emission during a single round-trip.
In the case of gain varying along the length, the round-trip gain can be expressed with integral
.
This definition assumes either flat-top profile of the laser beam inside the laser, or
some effective gain, averaged across the beam cross-section.

The amplification coefficient  can be defined as ratio of the 
output power  to the
input power :
.
It is related with gain;
.

The gain and the amplification coefficient should not be confused with the magnification coefficient.
The magnification characterizes the scale of enlarging of an image; such enlargement 
can be realized with passive elements, without gain medium.

Alternative terminology and notations
There is no established terminology about gain and absorption.
Everyone is free to use own notations, and it is not possible to 
cover all the systems of notations in this article.

In radiophysics, gain may mean logarithm of the amplification coefficient.

In many articles on laser physics, which do not use the amplification coefficient  defined above,
the gain is called Amplification coefficient, in analogy with Absorption coefficient, which is actually not a coefficient at all;
one has to multiply it to the length of propagation (thickness), change the signum, take inverse of the exponential,
and only then get the coefficient of attenuation of the sample.

Some publications use term increment instead of gain and decrement instead of absorption coefficient to avoid the ambiguity,

exploiting the analogy between paraxial propagation of quasi-monochromatic waves and time evolution of a dynamic system.

See also
Round-trip gain, gain multiplied by the length of propagation of the laser emission during a single round-trip
Disk laser
Effective cross-sections
McCumber relation

References

Laser science